William John Carron, Baron Carron, KSG, FRSA (19 November 1902 – 3 December 1969) was a British trade unionist and activist, who served as President of the Amalgamated Engineering Union (AEU) from 1956 until 1967.

Early life
Carron was born in Kingston upon Hull in 1902, the son of John Carron and Frances Ann Richardson. He attended St Mary's Roman Catholic Primary School, Hull Technical College, and he earned a Master of Arts degree from Oxford University.

Career
Beginning in 1918 Carron was apprenticed to a turner, Messrs Rose, at Downs and Thompson Ltd. until he became a journeyman in 1923. In 1935 he moved to the maintenance department of Reckitt and Coleman and became a shop steward of the AEU.

Carron joined the AEU in 1924. He was a Branch Secretary from 1932 to 1945. He later became District President. In 1950 he was elected to the post of Divisional Organizer and in 1956 he became an Executive Councillor. Finally, he was elected President in 1956, a position he held until 1967. He also served as a member of the General Council of the Trades Union Congress from 1954 to 1968.

Carron became a Director of the Bank of England in 1963 and in 1967 he became a Director of the United Kingdom Atomic Energy Authority.

Honours and awards
In October 1959, the Catholic Church appointed him a Knight of the Order of St. Gregory the Great, and he became a Knight Bachelor in 1963.

He became Baron Carron, of the City and County of Kingston upon Hull, on 11 July 1967.

Personal life
He married Mary Emma McGuire on 5 August 1931, with whom he had two daughters, Hilary Mary Carron and  Patricia Anne Carron.

He retired to Forest Hill, London, where he died in 1969, aged 67.

References

Sources
 
Lord Carron's papers at Churchill Archives Centre, Cambridge
 Peerage.com site

1902 births
1969 deaths
Trade unionists from Kingston upon Hull
Knights Bachelor
Life peers
Life peers created by Elizabeth II
People associated with the Bank of England
People from Forest Hill, London
Members of the General Council of the Trades Union Congress
Presidents of the Amalgamated Engineering Union
20th-century English businesspeople